Clivina demarzi is a species of ground beetle in the subfamily Scaritinae. It was described by Baehr in 1988.

References

demarzi
Beetles described in 1988